Billmeyer Wildlife Management Area is a Wildlife Management Area in Allegany County, Maryland adjacent to Green Ridge State Forest. Established in the 1920s for production of game birds, particularly turkeys, the  area is managed for general recreation and hunting pursuits. It is listed on the IUCN database as a Type V protected landscape.<

References

External links
 Billmeyer Wildlife Management Area

Wildlife management areas of Maryland
Protected areas of Allegany County, Maryland
IUCN Category V